Maribojoc, officially the Municipality of Maribojoc,  is a 4th class municipality in the province of Bohol, Philippines. According to the 2020 census, it has a population of 22,178 people.

The first language spoken is Cebuano, with a Boholano dialect, however English and Filipino are often also spoken and understood. Fishing and agriculture are the two main sources of livelihood.

The town of Maribojoc, Bohol celebrates its feast on November 10, to honor the town patron Saint Vincent.

History
Maribojoc was a fishing village when Jesuit priests Juan de Torres and Gabriel Sanchez landed in Baclayon in 1595, bringing Catholicism also to Maribojoc. Fr. Francisco Colín, an early Jesuit historian, listed the town's name as Malabooch and later changed it to Malabohoc.  During the pre-Spanish era, the town's name was Dunggoan, meaning "place of anchorage" and referred to the sheltered bay where sailors used to land and engage in business with the early settlers.

The Maribojoc parish, officially known as Parroquía de Santa Cruz, was founded in 1767, when the Jesuits left Maribojoc. Maribojoc was one of the nine big villages founded by the Augustinian Recollect friars when they took over in 1768. They laid the foundation of the Maribojoc church in 1798 on what was once swampy land, and it was finished in 1816, after 18 years of work. At the back of the church is a flight of stone stairs, built in 1864. Earlier, in 1796, the Punta Cruz Watchtower was built as a lookout against marauding pirates.

The town of Maribojoc was officially incorporated on 15 October 1860, and grew into a thriving town with a population of 18,200 by 1879.

Maribojoc was severely affected by the magnitude 7.2 earthquake which struck Bohol, suffering 16 fatalities and damage to some 3,700 homes, as well as total destruction of its Catholic church.

Geography

Barangays
Maribojoc comprises 22 barangays:

Climate

Demographics

Economy

Gallery

References

Sources

External links 
 [ Philippine Standard Geographic Code]
Maribojoc

Municipalities of Bohol
1767 establishments in the Spanish Empire